Larry Ferguson is an American screenwriter and film director. As a screenwriter, his film credits include Highlander, Beverly Hills Cop II, The Hunt for Red October and Alien 3.

Screenwriting credits
 1981 St. Helens (screenplay)
 1986 Highlander (screenplay)
 1987 Beverly Hills Cop II (screenplay)
 1988 The Presidio
 1990 The Hunt for Red October (screenplay)
 1991 Talent for the Game
 1992 Alien 3 (screenplay; with David Giler and Walter Hill)
 1992 Nails (TV film)
 1992 Beyond the Law (also director)
 1995 Gunfighter's Moon (also director)
 1996 Maximum Risk
 2002 Rollerball (screenplay; with John Pogue)

Acting credits
 1990 The Hunt for Red October (actor) as Chief of Boat 
 1992 Beyond the Law as (actor) (also director) Sheriff Kelly
 1993 Last Action Hero (actor) Himself

References

External links
 

American film directors
American male screenwriters
Living people
Place of birth missing (living people)
Year of birth missing (living people)
University of Oregon alumni
University of California, Davis alumni